Russia has an upper-middle income mixed economy with state ownership in strategic areas of the economy. Market reforms in the 1990s privatized much of Russian industry and agriculture, with notable exceptions to this privatization occurring in the energy and defense-related sectors.

Russia's vast geography is an important determinant of its economic activity, with some sources estimating that Russia contains over 30 percent of the world's natural resources. The World Bank estimates the total value of Russia's natural resources at US$75 trillion. Russia relies on energy revenues to drive most of its growth. Russia has an abundance of petroleum, natural gas and precious metals, which make up a major share of Russia's exports.  the oil-and-gas sector accounted for 16% of the GDP, 52% of federal budget revenues and over 70% of total exports.

Largest firms 
 State-owned enterprise

Historical rankings

1995
 RAO UES
 Gazprom
 LUKoil
 Rosugol
 Rosneft
 Norilsk Nickel
 YUKOS
 Siberian-Far Eastern Oil Company (Sidanko)
 Surgutneftegas
 AvtoVAZ
 Severstal
 Magnitogorsk Iron and Steel Works
 Novolipetsk Steel
 GAZ
 Eastern Oil Company
 Alrosa
 Nizhny Tagil Iron and Steel Works
 Tatneft
 West-Siberian Metal Plant
 Kuznetsk Iron and Steel Works

2000
 Gazprom
 LUKoil
 RAO UES
 Surgutneftegas
 Norilsk Nickel
 Bashkir Fuel Company
 YUKOS
 AvtoVAZ
 Rosneft
 Tatneft
 Tyumen
 Sibneft
 Alrosa
 Severstal
 Slavneft
 Magnitogorsk Iron and Steel Works
 Novolipetsk Steel
 GAZ
 Orenburgneft
 Siberian-Far Eastern Oil Company (Sidanco)

2005
 Gazprom
 LUKoil
 RAO UES
 Russian Railways
 YUKOS
 TNK-BP
 Surgutneftegas
 Sibneft
 Sberbank of Russia
 Norilsk Nickel
 Svyazinvest
 Severstal
 Slavneft
 Evraz Group
 AFK Sistema
 AvtoVAZ
 Rusal
 Tatneft
 Transneft
 Magnitogorsk Iron and Steel Works

2010
 Gazprom
 LUKoil
 Rosneft
 Russian Railways
 Sberbank of Russia
 TNK-BP
 AFK Sistema
 Surgutneftegaz
 Holding IDGC
 Severstal
 VTB Bank
 Tatneft
 Transneft
 Norilsk Nickel
 Evraz Group
 X5 Retail Group
 VimpelCom
 IES-Holding
 Svyazinvest
 Rusal

Notable firms 
This list includes notable companies with primary headquarters located in the country. The industry and sector follow the Industry Classification Benchmark taxonomy. Organizations which have ceased operations are included and noted as defunct.

See also 
 Economy of Russia
 List of banks in Russia
 Moscow Exchange

References

External links 
 Russian business map

Russia